Na'aman River,, is a stream in northwestern Israel. To the ancient writers Pliny, Tacitus and Josephus it was known as the Belus or Belos River of Phoenicia.

The Na'aman River today originates from springs near Ein Afek, primarily Ein Nymphit, and flows through the Zebulun Valley from south to north, before emptying into the Bay of Haifa (formerly Bay of Acre) south of Acre (Akko) on the Mediterranean Sea.

History
Once known as Belus or Belos, the river is  mentioned by Isidore of Seville. According to the legend, this is where glass-making was invented. Tacitus also mentions glassmaking at the Belus. The name is based on Baal.

Wetlands
The En Afek Nature Reserve near the Haifa Bay suburb of Kiryat Bialik, is the last remnant of the Nahal Na'aman wetlands.

References 

Rivers of Israel